Pa Takht may refer to:
Pa Takht, Isfahan
Pa Takht 1, Lorestan Province
Pa Takht 2, Lorestan Province
Pa Takht 3, Lorestan Province
 Patakht, Ilam Province

See also
Pa-ye Takht (disambiguation)